Goltzius is the name of

 Dominicus Goltzius (1644–1721), Dutch preacher
 Hendrick Goltzius (1558–1616), Dutch engraver and painter
 Hubert Goltzius, also known as Hubrecht Goltzius the younger, (1526–1583), Dutch humanist, printer, numismatist, engraver and painter
 Hubrecht Goltzius, also known as Hubrecht Golz, (died first half 16th century), Dutch painter
 Jakob Goltzius (died in the 16th century), Dutch engraver
 Julius Goltzius (died end of the 16th century), Dutch engraver

Surnames of Dutch origin